Bernard 'Bernie' Grimes was a male international table tennis player from the United States.

Table tennis career
He won a bronze medal at the 1938 World Table Tennis Championships in the Swaythling Cup (men's team event) with George Hendry, James McClure, Lou Pagliaro and Sol Schiff for the United States. 

He was from New York.

See also
 List of table tennis players
 List of World Table Tennis Championships medalists

References

American male table tennis players
World Table Tennis Championships medalists